Bruce James Oreck (born January 3, 1953) is a former American politician. He was the U.S. Ambassador to Finland from September 2009 to July 2015.

Personal life
Oreck was born to a Jewish family. His father is David Oreck who founded Oreck Corporation. He holds a Bachelor of Arts from The Johns Hopkins University, and a Juris Doctor from Louisiana State University, as well as a Master of Laws in Taxation from New York University. He became a partner in a New Orleans law firm representing the oil and gas industry. In 1992 he founded his own firm, Oreck, Crighton, Adams & Chase.

Oreck has authored several books on taxation. He was one of the major contributors to Barack Obama presidential campaign, 2008.

After his task as an ambassador ended, he decided to stay in Finland and was invited to teach in Aalto University.

Reception
Idriss  J. Aberkane and Eirin  B. Haug at E-International Relations cited Oreck as a "vanguard green diplomat" advocating noopolitik and the Blue Economy:

Here comes green diplomacy, here comes Noopolitik, here comes Oreck's [...] advice of turning a significant piece of the Department of Defense's gargantuan budget into a global investment for peace, prosperity, exemplarity and the Blue Economy rather than for destruction, just as Jimmy Carter had advised.

References

1953 births
Ambassadors of the United States to Finland
American bodybuilders
American lawyers
Johns Hopkins University alumni
Living people
Louisiana State University alumni
New York University School of Law alumni
American expatriates in Finland